Sydney Barnes was a professional cricketer who played for England in 27 Test matches between 1901 and 1914. He claimed 24 five-wicket hauls (five or more wickets in an innings) during his Test career. A five-wicket haul is regarded as a notable achievement, and as of 2014 fewer than 50 bowlers have taken more than 15 five-wicket hauls at international level in their cricketing careers. Barnes had only played seven first-class matches when he was chosen by Archie MacLaren to tour Australia, and played only 47 County Championship matches throughout his entire career, opting to play Minor Counties and Lancashire League cricket instead. He based his decision upon two main criteria – playing club cricket was more financially rewarding, and he was worried about having to bowl too much in first-class county cricket, and suffering from burnout.

Barnes is generally regarded as one of the best bowlers to have played international cricket, and finished his Test career with 189 wickets at an average of 16.43; his average places him among the top-ten bowlers in Test cricket. At the start of his career, he was a fast bowler who endeavoured to swing the ball, which was the common style of bowling at the time. However, Barnes experimented with bowling a little slower and cutting the ball, and developed both an off cutter and a leg cutter that he concluded were far more effective than swinging the ball. Despite his bowling talent, Barnes did not play any Test cricket between July 1902 and December 1907, as he was considered a "prima donna" who would only put in the effort when he was in the right mood, and being suitably paid. After his recall to the England side, he played regularly until the outbreak of the First World War in 1914, and was named by the Wisden Cricketers' Almanack as one of their Cricketers of the Year in 1910.

Barnes made his Test debut in December 1901 against Australia at the Sydney Cricket Ground, and it was in this match that he took his first international five-wicket haul. He claimed five wickets and conceded 65 runs, (noted as five for 65), in the first innings of the match. On his second Test appearance, during the same tour, Barnes collected six wickets in the first innings and seven wickets in the second innings, to complete the first of seven occasions in which he took ten or more wickets in a match. Barnes' best bowling performances were against the South African cricket team in their 1913–14 series in South Africa. In their summary of the tour, Wisden noted that; "his success exceeded all expectation. He was simply irresistible." Barnes took five-wicket hauls in four of the five Test matches on the tour, and claimed ten or more wickets in three of them. During the second Test, he recorded the best figures of his career, collecting eight for 56 in the first innings and nine for 103 in the second. His match figures of 17 for 159 were the best in Test cricket at the time, and though since surpassed by Jim Laker's 19 wickets in 1956, remain second among all bowlers in Tests. That series marked Barnes' final appearances in Test cricket.

Key

Tests

Notes and references
Notes

References

External links
 

Lists of English cricket records and statistics
Barnes, Sydney